María Elena Gutiérrez Castañeda (born 3 June 1977) is a Peruvian former footballer who played as a right back. She has been a member of the Peru women's national team.

International career
Gutiérrez capped for Peru at senior level during two Copa América Femenina editions (2003 and 2006).

References

1977 births
Living people
Peruvian women's footballers
Women's association football fullbacks
Peru women's international footballers
21st-century Peruvian women